Laubuka fasciata is a species of cyprinid fish endemic to river systems in Kerala, India. It is known as Malabar Hatchet Chela. The fish was first discovered in 1958 in the Anamalai streams by the Keralite fish scientist Eric Godwin Silas. The species was named Fasciata because of it shiny stripe on the body.

References

Laubuka
Danios
Fish of Asia
Taxa named by Eric Godwin Silas
Fish described in 1958